The Men's road race of the 2016 UCI Road World Championships was a cycling event that took place on 16 October 2016 in Doha, Qatar. It was the 83rd edition of the championship, and Slovakia's Peter Sagan was the defending champion.

Sagan became the first rider since Paolo Bettini in 2006 and 2007 to retain the rainbow jersey, after winning the sprint finish from a select group of riders that had made a break from the rest of the field in the opening half of the race, in the desert crosswinds. The silver medal went to 2011 world champion Mark Cavendish from Great Britain, a bike length in arrears of Sagan, with the bronze medal going to Belgium's Tom Boonen, the 2005 world champion. It was the first time that all three medallists were previous world title winners.

Course
The race was due to start and finish in the capital city of Doha, the home base for the Tour of Qatar. The route for the Worlds road races was presented in February 2015, which was made up of a loop of  through the desert and a finishing circuit in Doha city centre, including  of cobblestones. However it was also noted that the lack of long straight sections meant that the effect of the crosswinds frequently occurring in Qatar would be significantly lessened, reducing the race's unpredictability.

The start of the men's race was also moved to the Aspire Zone, with the riders heading out northwards towards Al Khor and returning to Doha.

Qualification
Qualification was based on performances on the UCI run tours and UCI World Ranking during 2016. Results from January to the middle of August counted towards the qualification criteria on both the UCI World Ranking and the UCI Continental Circuits across the world, with the rankings being determined upon the release of the numerous rankings on 22 August 2016.

The following nations qualified.

Schedule
All times are in Arabia Standard Time (UTC+03:00).

Participating nations
199 cyclists from 48 nations were entered in the men's road race, with 197 riders taking the start. The numbers of cyclists per nation are shown in parentheses.

Results

Final classification

Failed to finish
144 riders failed to finish, while Colombia's Rigoberto Urán and Norway's Vegard Breen failed to start.

References

External links

Men's road race
UCI Road World Championships – Men's road race
2016 in men's road cycling